Ivan Stefanović (born 9 August 1975) is a Serbian football manager and former player.

Playing career
Stefanović played for Napredak Kruševac and Obilić, before transferring abroad to Swiss club St. Gallen in March 2001.

Managerial career
Stefanović was appointed as manager of Serbian SuperLiga club Mladost Lučani in June 2021.

References

External links
 
 

1975 births
Living people
Sportspeople from Kruševac
Serbia and Montenegro footballers
Serbian footballers
Association football forwards
FK Napredak Kruševac players
FK Obilić players
FC St. Gallen players
Second League of Serbia and Montenegro players
First League of Serbia and Montenegro players
Swiss Super League players
Serbia and Montenegro expatriate footballers
Expatriate footballers in Switzerland
Serbia and Montenegro expatriate sportspeople in Switzerland
Serbian football managers
FK Napredak Kruševac managers
FK Mladost Lučani managers
Serbian SuperLiga managers